Tearing Down the Wall of Sound is a biography of record producer Phil Spector, written by Mick Brown and published in 2008.  Between 1961 and 1966, Spector's so-called "Wall of Sound" made him the most successful pop-record producer in the world, with more than 20 hits by artists such as The Righteous Brothers, The Crystals, and the Ronettes. Later in his life Spector became a recluse. While Brown was working on this book, actress Lana Clarkson was found shot dead in Spector’s foyer, and so the book is said to have an "inevitable true-crime element".

References

American biographies
Phil Spector
2007 non-fiction books
Music books